The  is an annual award which began in 1989 and is sponsored by the Yomiuri Shimbun and Shimizu Corporation with the backing of publisher Shinchōsha. The winner gets a contract to have their unpublished work published by Shinchōsha and receives ¥5 million. The contest is open to anyone, whether an already published author or not. Past winners include Riku Onda, Fuyumi Ono and Ken'ichi Sakemi.
It ceased in being awarded after 2013, its twenty-fifth year, but started again in 2017.

Selection committee

Historical: 1-7
Mitsuo Anno
Hiroshi Aramata
Hisashi Inoue
Genichirō Takahashi
Sumiko Yagawa

Historical: 8-10
Mitsuo Anno
Hiroshi Aramata
Hisashi Inoue
Makoto Shiina
Sumiko Yagawa

Historical: 11-13
Hiroshi Aramata
Hisashi Inoue
Makoto Shiina
Kōji Suzuki
Sumiko Yagawa

Historical: 14-22
Hiroshi Aramata
Hisashi Inoue
Mari Kotani
Makoto Shiina
Kōji Suzuki

Historical: 23-25
Hiroshi Aramata
Moto Hagio
Mari Kotani
Makoto Shiina
Kōji Suzuki

List of winners

Year 1: 1989
Grand Prize: Kōkyū Shōsetsu by Ken'ichi Sakemi
Superior Award: Uchū no Minamoto no Taki by Izumi Yamaguchi
Runners Up:
Tsuki no Shizuku 100% Juice by Hiroaki Okazaki
Cosmic Beetle by Takao Iwamoto
Mikazuki Ginjirō ga Iku: Īhatōbo no Bōkenhen by Tatsuhiko Takeyoshi

Year 2: 1990
Grand Prize: none
Superior Award: 
Rakuen by Kōji Suzuki, English translation: Paradise (Vertical. 2006)
Eiyū Rafashiden by Hiroaki Okazaki
Runners Up:
Last Magic by Tetsuya Murakami
Nichirin'ō Densetsu by Ayame Hara
Nenjutsu Kozō by Masakazu Katō

Year 3: 1991
Grand Prize: Balthasar no Henreki by Aki Satō
Superior Award: Nanka Tōkaitakushi by Gakuto Hara
Runners Up:
Refrain by Rin Sawamura
Tenmei Dōji by Yasuko Kawai
Rokubanmei no Sayoko by Riku Onda

Year 4: 1992
Grand Prize: none
Superior Award: Mukashi, Kasei no Atta Basho by Yūsaku Kitano
Runners Up:
Fantasia by Kyō Fujiwara
Aoi Eriru no Hana by Satoshi Utsugi
Yasha ga Ike Densetsu Ibun by Komoriten
Gāda no Hoshi by Satoko Tatsuki

Year 5: 1993
Grand Prize: Irahai by Tetsuya Satō
Superior Award: Shusen by Takenori Nanjō
Runners Up:
Tōkei Ibun by Fuyumi Ono
Kyūkei no Kisetsu by Riku Onda

Year 6: 1994
Grand Prize: 
Bagājimanupanasu by Eiichi Ikegami
Tettō Musashinosen by Minoru Ginbayashi
Superior Award: none
Runners Up:
Mujika Makīna by Fumio Takano
Sekai no Hate ni Umarete by Rin Sawamura
Tobichi no Jimu by Min Ishidate

Year 7: 1995
Grand Prize: none
Superior Award: 
Funtai by Masaya Fujita
Bus Stop no Shōsoku by Tatsushi Shimamoto
Runners Up:
Yōsorō 1983 by Tetsuya Ueno
Gakidō Sugoroku Soba Itohiki by Noboru Kihara

Year 8: 1996
Grand Prize: none
Superior Award: 
Island by Ken Hazuki
Aonekoya by Mitsuko Kido
Runners Up:
Dabusuton Kaidō by Mitsufumi Asagure
Kaiyū Opera Fune kara no Dasshutsu by Shunichi Hashimoto
Uchū Bōeigun by Masayuki Yagi

Year 9: 1997
Grand Prize: Baisuboiru Book by Kyōichi Imura
Superior Award: Kyōsō Kaiiki by Shigeru Satō
Runners Up:
Gonin Kazoku by Rin Sawamura
Junkai no Senritsu by Ryōji Yokoyama
Nendaiki "Anoekumene Mercury" by Fumiko Hagiwara

Year 10: 1998
Grand Prize: Organist by Yō Yamanoguchi
Superior Award:
Yan no Ita Shima by Rin Sawamura
Aoneko no Machi by Yūichi Suzumoto
Runners Up:
Gizō Shuki by Toshiro Kuwabara

Year 11: 1999
Grand Prize: Nobunaga Aruiha Taikanseru  Androgynous by Haruaki Utsukibara
Superior Award: BH85 by Mori Seika
Runners Up:
Crystal Memory by Tomomichi Nishiogi
Jacob no Hashigo wo Kudari Kitaru Mono by Aoi Hitomi

Year 12: 2000
Grand Prize: none
Superior Award: Kasō no Kishi by Naoko Saitō
Runners Up:
Namida Hime by Michimichi Okuno
Koiwarai by Yui Matsunomiya a.k.a. Hiroshi Matsumiya
Bachigaina Kōgeihin by Matsui Ōhama

Year 13: 2001
Grand Prize: Taiyō to Shisha no Kiroku by Chise Kasuya
Superior Award: Shabake by Megumi Hatakenaka
Runners Up:
Undead Returners by Jin Satō
Apāto to Oni to Kisekae Ningyō by Osamu Koshigaya

Year 14: 2002
Grand Prize: Short Stories a.k.a. Sekai no Hate no Niwa: Short Stories by Ken Nishizaki
Superior Award: Kai by Ayumi Oyama
Runners Up:
Kigeki no Naka no Kigeki: Minami no Kuni no Shakespeare by Keiichi Izumi
Amanouzume no Yūutsu by Humika Nakajima

Year 15: 2003
Grand Prize: Taiyō no Tou / Pyrenees no Shiro a.k.a. Taiyō no Tou by Tomihiko Morimi
Superior Award: Zou no Sumu Machi by Kyū Watanabe
Runners Up:
Rabbit Shinpan by Jun Kanooka
Kagemai by Noriaki Oda

Year 16: 2004
Grand Prize: Rasu Manchasu Tūshin by Hirayama Mizuho
Superior Award: Bonus Track by Osamu Koshigaya
Runners Up:
Kono Hareta Hi ni, Hitori de by Katsuhiro Harada
Ikejiri Water Court by Michiko Horii

Year 17: 2005
Grand Prize: Konharuya Gomez by Naka Saijō
Superior Award: none
Runners Up:
Tenjō no Niwa, Hikari no Jikoku by Natsuki Mizumachi
Kohaku Wacchi by Kazu Saiki

Year 18: 2006
Grand Prize: Boku Boku Sensei' by Hideyuki Niki
Superior Award: Yami Kagami by Asako Horikawa
Runners Up:Cappadocia Wine by Kazuho ŌharaYoru no Unicorn by Tetsuya Matsuda

Year 19: 2007
Grand Prize: Enken Den' by Hideaki Hironari
Superior Award: Brack Jack Kid by Takehiko Kubodera
Runners Up:
Karakuri Neko to Jikan Ryokō Dairiten by Kiri Wada
Kikkō Ki by Masayuki Fujita

Year 20: 2008
Grand Prize: Tenkai no Miyako: Aru Kenchikuka wo Meguru Monogatari a.k.a. Tenshi no Horō: Aru Kenchikuka wo Meguru Monogatari by Gen Nakamura
Superior Award: Kanojo no Shiranai Kanojo by Ran Satomi
Runners Up:
Ryūmori no Matsuei by Haruka Mayama
Ideal by Yū Matsuzaki a.k.a. Yūri Matsuzaki

Year 21: 2009
Grand Prize: Gettōya by Junko Tōda / Zōdaiha ni Tsugu by Masakuni Oda
Superior Award: none
Runners Up:
Kuzira ga Tobu Yoru by Minato Yamada
Shishōsetsu by Sen Satō
Kachō Ryōran by Uro Jinno

Year 22: 2010
Grand Prize: Wadatsumi no Chinkonka a.k.a. Zenya no Kōseki by Kiri Shino
Superior Award: Shizuka no Umi a.k.a. Tsuki no Sanagi by Akira Ishino
Runners Up:
Gehō Koji KA.SIN by Kazumi Kamimori
Hall Shovel: Aru Anahori no Monogatari by Susumu Asari

Year 23: 2011
Grand Prize: Sazanami no Kuni by Umiyuri Katsuyama
Superior Award: Yoshida Kigurumare Night by Shuntarō Hino
Runners Up:
Zanzō no Tobira by Kō Aomi
Nigemachi Fenuse by Nio Takano

Year 24: 2012
Grand Prize: none
Superior Award: Asa no Yōka by Aoba Mikuni / Worker by Shunsuke Seki
Runners Up:
Kyōryū Gift by Ayako Inoue
Ongoku by Mika Harima

Year 25: 2013
Grand Prize: Kotoshi no Okurimono a.k.a. Hoshi no Tami no Christmas by Natsuki Koyata
Superior Award: Kinoko Mura no Onna Eiyū a.k.a. Wasure Mura no Yen to Shinkai no Inu by Shin Suzuki a.k.a. Shin Saezaki
Runners Up:
Akashic Museum by Kiyomi Amahara
Akutō Kaden by Aoi Sakamoto

References

External links
 Japan Fantasy Novel Award 

1989 establishments in Japan
Awards established in 1989
Fantasy awards
Japanese literary awards
F
Mitsui Fudosan
Shimizu Corporation
Japanese fantasy